Franco-British Aviation (usually known by its initials FBA) was an aircraft manufacturer of the early 20th century, headquartered in London and with its production facilities around Paris. Specialising in seaplanes, it was established in 1913 by Louis Schreck and André Beaumont.

History
The company was established in 1913 by Louis Schreck and André Beaumont. 

Louis Schreck was technical director of the French subsidiary in Argenteuil. The first activity of the company was the development of a flying boat hull derived from Donnet-Leveque Type A. The aircraft, a biplane with a single engine mounted between the wings with a pusher propeller, was originally called FBA-Leveque, then it was renamed FBA Type A.

It is from this first model that the manufacturer derived various models that would be used by the forces of Triple Entente: France, United Kingdom and the Russian Empire.

During World War I, the company produced large numbers of small flying boats for the navies of France, Russia, Italy, and the UK.

Following the war, the company was reorganised as Hydravions Louis Schreck FBA as a purely French concern and continued building aircraft in the same class. One of these, the FBA 17, sold in quantity.

In 1922, Émile Paumier became technical director and developed the brand models from the FBA model Type 10. From the Type 19 on, the company abandoned the conventional configuration with pusher propeller to finally adopt the tractor propeller.

The company could not repeat its wartime successes. The lack of orders, especially for civilian models, led to production being stopped in 1931. In 1934, on the verge of collapse, the workshops of the factory were sold to Bernard. Bernard was also struggling and itself failed later in 1935.

Aircraft

References

Multinational aircraft manufacturers
Defunct aircraft manufacturers of France
Manufacturing companies disestablished in 1935
French companies established in 1913
1913 establishments in England
1934 disestablishments in France
France–United Kingdom relations
British companies established in 1913
Manufacturing companies established in 1913
1934 disestablishments in England
Manufacturing companies based in London
British companies disestablished in 1934